Aleurodicus is a genus of whiteflies in the family Aleyrodidae.

Species
Aleurodicus antidesmae Corbett, 1926
Aleurodicus antillensis Dozier, 1936
Aleurodicus araujoi Sampson & Drews, 1941
Aleurodicus capiangae Bondar, 1923
Aleurodicus cinnamomi Takahashi, 1951
Aleurodicus coccolobae Quaintance & Baker, 1913
Aleurodicus cocois (Curtis, 1846)
Aleurodicus destructor Mackie, 1912
Aleurodicus dispersus Russell, 1965
Aleurodicus dugesii Cockerell, 1896 (giant whitefly)
Aleurodicus essigi Sampson & Drews, 1941
Aleurodicus flavus Hempel, 1922
Aleurodicus fucatus Bondar, 1923
Aleurodicus guppyi Quaintance & Baker, 1913
Aleurodicus holmesii Maskell, 1896
Aleurodicus indicus Regu & David, 1992
Aleurodicus inversus Martin, 2004
Aleurodicus jamaicensis Cockerell, 1902
Aleurodicus juleikae Bondar, 1923
Aleurodicus machili Takahashi, 1931
Aleurodicus magnificus Costa Lima, 1928
Aleurodicus maritimus Hempel, 1922
Aleurodicus marmoratus Hempel, 1922
Aleurodicus neglectus Quaintance & Baker, 1913
Aleurodicus niveus Martin, 2004
Aleurodicus ornatus Cockerell, 1893
Aleurodicus pauciporus Martin, 2004
Aleurodicus pulvinatus Maskell, 1896
Aleurodicus rugioperculatus Martin, 2004
Aleurodicus talamancensis Martin, 2005
Aleurodicus trinidadensis Quaintance & Baker, 1913
Aleurodicus vinculus Martin, 2004
Aleurodicus wallaceus Martin, 1988

References

Whiteflies